Greater Magadha is a concept in studies of the early history of India. It is used to refer to the political and cultural sphere that developed in the lower Gangetic plains (Johannes Bronkhorst defines the region to comprise modern day Bihar and eastern Uttar Pradesh) during the Vedic age.

The Śramaṇa culture of Greater Magadha developed parallel to but separate from the Vedic culture to its west, that was characteristic of the upper Ganges basin (Ganga-Yamuna doab).

According to Bronkhorst, the sramana culture arose in "Greater Magadha," which was Indo-Aryan, but not Vedic. In this culture, Kshatriyas were placed higher than Brahmins, and it rejected Vedic authority and rituals.

Overview
The concept was developed in a book by the indologist Johannes Bronkhorst (2007), where he defines the region to comprise modern day Bihar and eastern Uttar Pradesh. They developed an ideological opposition to the sacrifice and ritual slaying of animals. Later this non-vedic traditions gave rise to religions or school of philosophy such as Jainism which later gave rise to concepts like ahimsa.

According to Bronkhorst, the śramana culture arose in "Greater Magadha," which was Indo-Aryan, but not Vedic. In this culture, Kshatriyas were placed higher than Brahmins, and it rejected Vedic authority and rituals.

Out of the ideological opposition between these two cultural spheres – the vedic realm of Kuru-Panchala in the west, and śramana of Greater Magadha in the east – developed the two main religious & spiritual ideologies of Ancient India.

Vedic religion, which placed a lot of importance on the system of ritual correctness, arose out of the culture of the erstwhile Kuru-Panchala realm, while the śramaṇa tradition, which placed emphasis on the spiritual works, that developed in Greater Magadha, later to gave rise to non-vedic (non-brahmanical) religions such as Buddhism, Jainism, Ajivika, Lokāyata and Ajñana.

See also
 Magadha
 Vedic period
 Mahajanapadas
 History of India

References 

Historiography of India
Vedic period
Magadha
History of Bihar